Robin Utseth Bjørnholm-Jatta (born 27 January 1994) is a professional footballer who plays as a left-back for Stjørdals-Blink. Born in Norway, he represents the Gambia national team.

Club career
A youth product of Rosenborg's youth academy, Bjørnholm-Jatta began his career with their reserve side. He then moved to the Norwegian semi-pro clubs Skjetten, Elverum, and KFUM before spending time in the US college system with Coastal Carolina Chanticleers and the Stony Brook Seawolves. He returned to Norway in 2018, signing with Byåsen.

International career
Bjørnholm-Jatta was born in Norway to a Gambian father and Norwegian mother. He was a youth international for Norway. He received his first call-up to the senior Gambia national team in October 2020. He debuted for the Gambia in a 2–0 friendly win over Niger on 6 June 2021.

References

External links
 
 
 Stony Brook Athletics Profile

1994 births
Living people
Footballers from Trondheim
People with acquired Gambian citizenship
Gambian footballers
The Gambia international footballers
Norwegian footballers
Norway youth international footballers
Norwegian people of Gambian descent
Gambian people of Norwegian descent
Association football fullbacks
Coastal Carolina Chanticleers men's soccer players
Stony Brook Seawolves men's soccer players
Rosenborg BK players
Skjetten SK players
Elverum Fotball players
KFUM-Kameratene Oslo players
Byåsen Toppfotball players
IL Stjørdals-Blink players
Norwegian First Division players
Norwegian Second Division players
Norwegian Third Division players
Norwegian Fourth Division players
Norwegian expatriate footballers
Norwegian expatriate sportspeople in the United States
Expatriate soccer players in the United States